Corey Stevenson Powell (born January 7, 1966) is an American science writer and journalist, particularly known for his writing for Discover magazine, of which he became Editor-in-Chief in 2012, and his longstanding collaboration with Bill Nye. Powell co-authored three books with Nye, and as of 2019 co-hosted a podcast with Nye as well.

Early life, education
Powell graduated from Harvard University with a degree in history and science, with his senior thesis, published in 1988, being on "J. Homer Lane and the Internal Structure of the Sun." Powell became a writer for Discover and in 2002 published his first book, God in the Equation : How Einstein Transformed Religion. Powell contended therein that traditional forms of religion are giving way to a new cultural fusion of science and mysticism, which Powell called sci/religion. Powell felt that this was brought about to a great degree by Albert Einstein's own embrace of the deistic elements of Spinozism. Reviews were somewhat mixed, with reviewers finding Powell to have strained too hard to find a religious theme in modern science.

Editor and author
Powell was a member of the editorial board of Scientific American, and became the Editor-in-Chief of Discover in 2012. He has additionally been a SHERP visiting scholar at New York University. In 2014, Powell notably disputed the account written by astrophysicist Steven Soter in the segment of Cosmos: A Spacetime Odyssey addressing the story of Giordano Bruno, the dispute described as follows:

Powell has co-authored three books with Bill Nye:
Everything All at Once: How to Unleash Your Inner Nerd, Tap Into Radical Curiosity, and Solve Any Problem (July 11, 2017) 
Unstoppable: Harnessing Science to Change the World (Nov 10, 2015) 
Undeniable: Evolution and the Science of Creation (Nov 4, 2014) 

Beginning in 2019, Powell co-hosted Nye's podcast, of which Nye commented that Powell was "very well read about the news of science, and he offers charming commentary".

Personal life
Powell is married with two daughters, and lives in Brooklyn.

References

1966 births
Harvard University alumni
Disney people
Bill Nye
American science journalists
Writers from Brooklyn
Living people
Discover (magazine) people